Yves Preston (born June 14, 1956) is a Canadian former professional ice hockey player who played 28 NHL games with the Philadelphia Flyers. He now coaches high school ice hockey at the University School of Milwaukee, where he is the boys' varsity defensive coach.

External links
 

1956 births
Canadian ice hockey left wingers
Chicoutimi Saguenéens (QMJHL) players
Dayton Gems players
Laval National players
Living people
Maine Mariners players
Maine Nordiques players
Milwaukee Admirals (IHL) players
Philadelphia Flyers players
Undrafted National Hockey League players
Wichita Wind players
Beauce Jaros players
Ice hockey people from Montreal